The Defender in the America's Cup sailing competition is the team that holds the trophy and has been challenged by another union for the title return.

Defenders

See also
America's Cup
Challenger (America's Cup)
List of America's Cup challengers and defenders

References

External links
 

America's Cup